Poulopoulos is a surname. Notable people with the surname include:

Georgios Poulopoulos (born 1975), Greek footballer
Giannis Poulopoulos (1941–2020), Greek singer-songwriter

Greek-language surnames